Reen Bessie Kachere (24 April 1954 - 1 August 2022) was a Malawian politician. She was the minister of gender, child and community development. Prior to the September 2011 cabinet reshuffle, she served as the minister for persons with disabilities and the rlderly. She was a member of the parliament for the Neno West Constituency.

Katsonga - Kachere Stand off
In 2011 political tensions between former parliamentarian for Neno West Constituency Mark Katsonga Phiri and Kachere developed over development projects in the constituency. She blocked attempts by Katsonga to rehabilitate of boreholes and roads because Kachere accused Katsonga of having political motivations behind the projects. It is an ongoing issue but no projects have been implemented.

References

Members of the National Assembly (Malawi)
Women government ministers of Malawi
Malawian women in politics
1954 births
2022 deaths